Frances Nimmo Greene (April 5, 1867 – December 9, 1937) was an American educator and author of novels, children's literature, and plays. She was the author of: King Arthur and his court, 1901, stories of chivalry for children; With spurs of gold, 1905, stories of chivalry for children written in collaboration with Dolly Kirk; My country's voice, 1917, for juveniles; America first, 1917, for juveniles; American ideals; a series of patriotic readers for children; a group of one act plays; and the following novels, Into the night, 1909; The Right of the Strongest, 1913; One clear call, 1914; and The devil to pay, 1917. Three of her novels were adapted into films, The Devil to Pay (1920), One Clear Call (1922), and The Right of the Strongest (1924). She also wrote more than 50 short stories which were published in newspapers and magazines of national repute. In addition, Greene organized the library division of the Alabama State Department of Archives and History.

Early life and education
Frances Nimmo Greene was born in Tuscaloosa, Alabama, April 5, 1867. Known to the public as "Dixie", she was raised in a historic plantation house, later known as the Jemison School building.

Her father, Thomas Finley Greene (1829–1905), was a clergyman, and her mother was Virginia F. Owen (1828–1905); they married in 1854. She was descended through her father from an old South Carolina family, and through her mother from Virginia ancestry. Her mother's family had literary tastes for several generations.

Greene had five older siblings: Annie (1855–1923), John (1857–1859), Kate (1859–1870), Robert (1862–1926), and Mary (1865–1918). The Greenes were a "literary" family from their nursery days. The siblings scribbled as children, and all, more or less, continued to write in later years, but Frances showed from the first her talent. She read widely, and she inherited from her mother a passionate love for Virginia and its history-a love that evolved significantly in her work.

Greene was educated at home by her mother and at the Tuscaloosa Female College, which she attended two years, leaving school at age of 16.

She removed to Birmingham with her parents after leaving school.

Career

Teacher and librarian
From Birmingham, Greene went with the family to Montgomery, Alabama, where she taught almost immediately after her school days. While teaching in a mining town in north Alabama, she conceived the idea of writing sketches for publication. Her first attempt, "Yankees in Dixie," was promptly accepted by the Philadelphia Times. Her talent was recognized from the beginning by editors, and their encouragement stimulated her desire to write. She contributed to that paper many letters on southern affairs. She also wrote for the Birmingham Age-Herald and other southern papers. Besides writing in prose, she sometimes wrote verse.

She taught for years, principally in Montgomery public schools. In 1906, while serving as principal of the Capitol Hill School, in Montgomery, Greene was named as temporary secretary of the Alabama State Department of Archives and History.

In 1907, she resigned as a teacher to become Assistant in charge of Library Extension, Department of Archives and History, in Montgomery, a position she held for one year. During that time, her enthusiastic spirit and vigorous personality roused a very necessary interest in the library conditions of the state. In recognition of her ability, she was elected secretary of the Alabama Library Association.

During 1911-12, she edited the woman's page of The Birmingham News, and the following year, became director of the Birmingham Public Library.

Author

She returned to Montgomery in 1913, and thereafter devoted her entire time to writing.

Greene's first novel, Into the Night, published by the Crowells, was a story of modern New Orleans, dealing with a Mafia mystery. It was her first sustained piece of fiction, and its success was immediate and flattering. Other novels, The Right of the Strongest, One Clear Call, The Devil to Pay, followed in quick succession, all published by Scribner's. All her fiction was popular. The field of the novel, limitless as it is, never engaged Greene's entire interest. It was only one phase of her literary expression. She also wrote books for young people" King Arthur's Court, and With Spurs of Gold.

Versatile as she was -novelist, playwright, journalist, poet- the phase of her work in literature that stood out pre-eminently was that of her books for children. In these books, her determination to develop a higher national consciousness in the mind of the child becomes clear. This vision was intensified by the years of the Civil War, as the titles of other published books showed: My Country's Voice, America First, and American Ideals.

She was already most favorably known in the field of children's literature by King Arthur's Court, a book which was favorably received as soon as it was published, and which held its place with honor for more than a decade. Through this book, thousands of children became familiar with the Arthurian legends. The popularity of this book was so great that Greene and her cousin, Dolly Williams Kirk, whose poems had magazine publication, brought out in collaboration, a volume of stories of chivalry, With Spurs of Gold. This book received high praise from readers, and was used in college courses.

Viewed as a synthetic whole, and taken in conjunction with her earlier books on chivalry, the scope of her series of readers, American Ideals, was of an educative value beyond anything ever done before in this line. This series, published by Scribner's, contained in the 'Colonial' volume, a chapter, "Virginia and the Ideal of Civil Liberty", which presented Virginia's place in history.

Later, she was engaged in collaborating with her sister, Mrs. Annie Greene Brown, on a volume of short stories.

Some of Greene's novels were adapted into films. Months of negotiation were required before Louis B. Mayer obtained the film rights to the Greene book, One Clear Call, as arrangements had already been made for its production on the theater stage. A record price secured the dramatic rights to the book for the screen, which was adapted to the screen by Bess Meredyth, and was released in 1922 
The Right of the Strongest was adapted to the screen by Doty Hobart, and released in 1924. It is a drama of the Alabama hillbillies and their struggle to retain their rights as squatters.

In 1927, Greene was teaching short story writing in Birmingham. All Night Long (1929), a comedy in three acts, was accepted by the Walter Baker Company in 1929. In 1937, she co-authored The Last Enemy, a three-act play, with Robert H. Greene.

Personal life
In politics, she was a Democrat, and in religion, an Episcopalian. She was reared by Methodist parents in the Methodist church, but in Birmingham, she joined the Protestant Episcopal church. In 1922, Greene made an unsuccessful run for a seat on the Alabama State Democratic Executive Committee.
She delivered an address on behalf of the Democratic ticket in 1928.

Unmarried, Greene divided her time between New York City and her brother's home in Montgomery.

Frances Nimmo Greene died in Birmingham, Alabama, December 9, 1937.

Selected publications

Children's literature

 Legends of King Arthur and His Court (Ginn and Co., Boston, 1901) (text)
 With spurs of gold; heroes of chivalry and their deeds (with Dolly Williams Kirk; Little, Brown and Co., Boston, 1905) (text)
 Heroes of Chivalry and Their Deeds (with Dolly Williams Kirk; 1910) (text)
 America First (Scribner's, New York, 1918) (text)
 My Country's Voice (Scribner's, New York, 1918) (text)
 American Ideals: A Series of Readers for Schools (Scribner's, New York, 1920-1922) (text, book 5; text, book 6)

Short stories
 "Yankees in Dixie" (no later than 1893)

Novels

 Into the night, a story of New Orleans (Scribner's, New York, 1909) (text)
 The Right of the Strongest (Scribner's, New York, 1913) (text)
 One Clear Call (Scribner's, New York, 1914) (text)
 The devil to pay (Scribner's, New York, 1917) (text)

Plays
 The Ultimate American: A Comedy (1913)
 Speaking of Adam: A Comedy in Three Acts (1915)
 All Night Long (1929)
 The Last Enemy (with Robert H. Greene; 1937)

Filmography
Films based on Greene's novels:
 The Devil to Pay (1920)
 One Clear Call (1922)
 The Right of the Strongest (1924)

Notes

References

Further reading
 Rockett, Anita, (1926), An Appreciation of the Literary Work of Frances Nimmo Greene (1926)

External links
 
 

1867 births
1937 deaths
20th-century American novelists
20th-century American dramatists and playwrights
20th-century American women writers
People from Tuscaloosa, Alabama
Writers from Alabama
Educators from Alabama
American children's writers
American women novelists
American women children's writers
American women dramatists and playwrights
Wikipedia articles incorporating text from A Woman of the Century